Superlevation may refer to

 Cant (road/rail), the difference in elevation between two edges of a road or railway track
 , the correction for gravitational fall of a projectile